Joanne Züger (born 17 November 2000) is a Swiss tennis player.

Züger has a career-high singles ranking by the WTA of world No. 163, achieved on 29 August 2022. She also has a career-high WTA doubles ranking of world No. 284, achieved on 1 August 2022. She has won two singles titles and two doubles titles at tournaments of the ITF Circuit.

Career
Züger made her WTA Tour debut at the 2022 Hamburg European Open, where she qualified for the main draw defeating Anastasia Gasanova in the final round. She won her first WTA Tour-level match defeating Jule Niemeier.

Grand Slam performance timelines

Singles

ITF Circuit finals

Singles: 9 (2 titles, 7 runner-ups)

Doubles: 6 (2 titles, 3 runner-ups, 1 canc.)

Notes

References

External links
 
 

2000 births
Living people
Swiss female tennis players